Kevin Thelwell (born 27 October 1973) is an English football coach who is the Director of Football of  club Everton. He is the former Director of Football at Wolverhampton Wanderers having previously held the position of academy manager and later head of football development and recruitment at the club, following similar positions at Derby County and Preston North End respectively. Prior to this, Thelwell was Director of Coach Education for the Football Association of Wales Trust where he was responsible for the UEFA Advanced Licence and Pro Licence courses. In February 2020, Thelwell and his family moved to America, where he took up the role of head of sport at New York Red Bulls. 

On 25 February 2022, Thelwell returned to England and was appointed as the Director of Football of  club Everton.

Playing career
Thelwell grew up in the north west. As a schoolboy he progressed through the academy at Crewe Alexandra before moving to Shrewsbury Town where he gained an apprenticeship and progressed into the professional ranks. He failed to make a senior appearance for the club though and instead led a semi pro career with clubs such as Northwich Victoria, Winsford United and Congleton Town.

Coaching career

Thelwell began his coaching career with the Football Association of Wales Trust following his appointment as the Football Development Officer for Denbighshire, North Wales in 1998. In the same year he became one of the youngest coaches to successfully complete the FA/UEFA Advanced Licence at 25 years of age. Thelwell also holds the FAW/UEFA Advanced Licence and UEFA Pro Licence. Thelwell has also successfully completed a Bsc (Hons) degree in Sport Science and is currently completing the LMA/PFA Certificate in Applied Management at Warwick University.

In 2002, he was appointed as Director of Coach Education with the responsibility of coordinating and developing coach education at all levels in Wales. This included the organisation and delivery of the prestigious FAW/UEFA Advanced Licence and Pro Licence courses accessed by coaches and managers working within the professional game.

In the summer of 2005, Thelwell was appointed by Billy Davies as Director of Youth at Preston North End and in his first season saw his youth team win the Football League Youth Alliance National Cup. At the beginning of the 2006–07 season, Davies left Preston to become manager of Derby County and made Thelwell his first appointment as Academy Manager, becoming the youngest academy manager in the country, aged 32.

He combined this academy role with that of acting first team coach, helping the club win promotion to the Premier League in his first season via the play-offs.  After an unsuccessful start to their top flight campaign, Billy Davies left the club by mutual consent in November 2007 and Thelwell was appointed as caretaker manager in the interim (two-day) period before the appointment of Paul Jewell as their new manager.

In April 2008 he left Derby County and was appointed academy manager at Wolverhampton Wanderers, replacing Chris Evans.
Thelwell is also the author of several coaching books including "Coaching the European 3-5-2".

On 3 February 2020, Thelwell made a move to the United States to become the head of sport at Major League Soccer side New York Red Bulls. At New York Thelwell oversaw all aspects of the sporting side of the club with Sporting Director Denis Hamlett reporting to Thelwell.  

He left New York Red Bulls on 25 February 2022 to take up the vacant Director of Football role at Everton.

References

External links
 Wolves profile

1973 births
Living people
Congleton Town F.C. players
Association footballers not categorized by position
English football managers
English footballers
Northwich Victoria F.C. players
Wolverhampton Wanderers F.C. non-playing staff
Preston North End F.C. non-playing staff
Derby County F.C. non-playing staff
Shrewsbury Town F.C. players
Winsford United F.C. players